Dysstroma colvillei is a species of geometrid moth in the family Geometridae. It is found in North America.

The MONA or Hodges number for Dysstroma colvillei is 7192.

References

Further reading

External links

 

Hydriomenini
Articles created by Qbugbot
Moths described in 1926